Matteo Nodari (born May 24, 1991, in Alzano Lombardo) is an Italian professional footballer for Tritium Calcio 1908.

External links
 

1991 births
Living people
U.C. AlbinoLeffe players
Italian footballers
Serie B players
Association football goalkeepers
A.C. Ponte San Pietro Isola S.S.D. players